The 8th Congress of the Russian Communist Party (b) was held in Moscow 18–23 March 1919. The Congress was attended by 301 voting delegates who represented 313,766 Party members. A further 102 delegates attended with speaking rights, but no vote. It elected the 8th Central Committee.

Debates
The Congress agenda was:
Report of the 7th Central Committee
Programme of the R.C.P.(B.)
Foundation of the Communist International
War situation and war policy
Work in the countryside
Organisational problems
Other business

18 March
Vladimir Lenin's opening words were dedicated to Yakov Sverdlov, who had died on 16 March. He also submitted the Report of the Central Committee. Mikhail Kalinin replaced Sverdlov as Soviet head of state, a position he held till his death in March 1946.

19 March

The Report on the Party Programme introduced the principal issue of the day.

The congress adopted a new Party Program. This program included a description of capitalism and imperialism, and compared two systems of state – the bourgeois-democratic system and the Soviet system. It specified the specific tasks of the Party in the struggle for socialism: completion of the expropriation of the bourgeoisie; administration of the economic life of the country in accordance with a single socialist plan; participation of the trade unions in the organization of the national economy; socialist labour discipline; utilization of bourgeois experts in the economic field under the control of Soviet bodies; gradual and systematic enlistment of the middle peasantry in the work of socialist construction.

The congress adopted Lenin's proposal to include in the program in addition to a definition of imperialism as the highest stage of capitalism, the description of industrial capitalism and simple commodity production contained in the old program adopted at the 2nd Congress of the Russian Social Democratic Labour Party. Lenin considered it essential that the program should take account of the complexity of the economic system and note the existence of diverse economic formations in the country, including small commodity production, as represented by the middle peasants.

Nikolai Bukharin, however, proposed that the clauses dealing with capitalism, small commodity production, the economy of the middle peasantry, should have been left out of the program.

Bukharin and Georgy Pyatakov differed with Lenin on the national question. Bukharin and Pyatakov argued against the inclusion in the program of a clause on the right of nations to self-determination; claiming that the slogan that would hinder the victory of the proletarian revolution and the union of the proletarians of different nationalities. Lenin's rejection of the standpoints of Bukharin and Pyatakov was accepted

After the first Politburo was created in October 1917, in order to manage the Revolution, this second Politburo was voted by the Congress of the party, and appointed with five full members (Vladimir Lenin, Joseph Stalin, Leon Trotsky, Lev Kamenev and Nikolay Krestinsky) and three non-voting members (Grigory Zinoviev, Nikolai Bukharin and Mikhail Kalinin). The first Orgburo was also set up. Stalin and Krestinsky were members as well. The other three members were Elena Stasova, Alexander Beloborodov, Leonid Serebryakov plus candidate member Matevi Muranov.

22 March
The Congress sent greetings to the Hungarian Soviet Republic:

"The Eighth Congress of the Russian Communist Party sends ardent greetings to the Hungarian Soviet Republic. Our Congress is convinced that the time is not far distant when communism will triumph all over the world. The working class of Russia is making every effort to come to your aid. The proletariat throughout the world is watching your struggle with intense interest and will not permit the imperialists to raise their hands against the new Soviet Republic."

Decisions of the Congress

Elections during the Congress

Central Committee: 19 elected members, 8 candidates to Central Committee membership
Central Revision Committee: three elected members

Adoption of Resolutions and Decisions 

 Report of the Central Committee;
 Program's project;
 War issue;
 Organisation issue;
 Attitude towards middle peasantry;
 Political propaganda and enlightenment and educational work in the countryside;
 Working amongst female proletariat;
 Working amongst youth;
 Party and Soviet printing.

References
Eighth Congress of the R.C.P.(B.) accessed 9 April 2009
Mark von Hagen. Soldiers in the Proletarian Dictatorship: The Red Army and the Soviet Socialist State, 1917–1930. Cornell University Press, 1990, pp. 57–63.
Eighth Congress of the Russian Communist Party (Bolshevik) in The Great Soviet Encyclopedia, 3rd Edition (1970–1979).
The Military Writings of Leon Trotsky. Volume 1, 1918; Theses adopted by the Eighth Congress of the Russian Communist Party in March 1919

Communist Party of the Soviet Union 08
1919 in Russia
1919 conferences
March 1919 events